Gladys Blake was an American author of juvenile fiction (born Fayetteville Tenn) of  George  Everett  and  Blanche (Morgan) B. Educated in Nashville, Tennessee public schools. 

Writer of: 

 The Mysterious Tutor, 1925; 
 The Old King's Treasure, 1926; 
 At Bow View, 1926;  
 The Scratches on the Glass, 1927; 
 Doris  Derides, 1927; 
 Dona Isabella's Adventures, 1928, 
 The Pomdexter Pride, 1929; 
 Fortunate Shipwreck, 1936; 
 Sally Goes to Court, 1937; 
 The Mystery of the Silver Chain, 1939; 
 Henrietta and the Governor, 1964. 

Contributor to Youth's Companion and various other publications. General character writing, juvenile fiction. Lived at Atlanta,  Georgia.

Sources

WHO'S WHO AMONG NORTH AMERICAN AUTHORS VOL - IV 1929 - 1930 by ALBERTA LAWRENCE  p. 108 link

American writers of young adult literature
Year of birth missing
Year of death missing
American women writers